Aleksandr Nikiforovich Voronin (May 23, 1951 – September 26, 1992) was a Russian weightlifter and Olympic champion who competed for the Soviet Union.

He was born in Chelyabinsk.

Voronin won a gold medal at the 1976 Summer Olympics in Montreal.

References

External links 
 

1951 births
1992 deaths
Russian male weightlifters
Soviet male weightlifters
Olympic weightlifters of the Soviet Union
Weightlifters at the 1976 Summer Olympics
Olympic gold medalists for the Soviet Union
Honoured Masters of Sport of the USSR
Olympic medalists in weightlifting
Medalists at the 1976 Summer Olympics
Deaths from falls
20th-century Russian people